Peripheral T-cell lymphoma refers to a group of T-cell lymphomas that develop away from the thymus or bone marrow.

Examples include:
 Cutaneous T-cell lymphomas
 Angioimmunoblastic T-cell lymphoma
 Extranodal natural killer/T-cell lymphoma, nasal type
 Enteropathy type T-cell lymphoma
 Subcutaneous panniculitis-like T-cell lymphoma
 Anaplastic large cell lymphoma
 Peripheral T-cell lymphoma-Not-Otherwise-Specified

In ICD-10, cutaneous T-cell lymphomas are classified separately.

References

External links 

Non-Hodgkin lymphoma